Gråt elskede mann (Cry, Beloved Man) is a Norwegian drama film from 1971 directed by Nils R. Müller. The film was produced by Øyvind Vennerød, and Egil Monn-Iversen composed the music for the film. Sverre Holm stars as Nikolai in the film.

The film is based on a novel by Bjørg Vik with the same title. However, when the film was finished, the author thought it was so bad that she demanded that her name be removed from the film's credits and all marketing. The remuneration she received was donated to the Norwegian Authors' Union's solidarity fund.

Cast 

 Sverre Holm as Nikolai
 Gertie Jung as Ilni
 Birgitta Molin as Eva
 Berit Kullander as Helen 
 Espen Skjønberg
 Helge Reiss
 Pål Skjønberg
 Randi Borch

References

External links
 
 Gråt elskede mann at Filmfront
 Gråt elskede mann at the National Library of Norway

1971 films
Norwegian drama films
Films directed by Nils R. Müller